The warbling antbird is a complex consisting of six species of antbirds that until recently were considered a single species found throughout the Amazon in South America. Based on vocal differences and to a lesser degree differences in plumages, it has been recommended treating them as separate species:

 Guianan warbling antbird (Hypocnemis cantator).
 Imeri warbling antbird (Hypocnemis flavescens).
 Peruvian warbling antbird (Hypocnemis peruviana).
 Yellow-breasted warbling antbird (Hypocnemis subflava).
 Rondonia warbling antbird (Hypocnemis ochrogyna).
 Spix's warbling antbird (Hypocnemis striata).

References
 Isler, Isler, & Whitney. 2007. Species limits in antbirds (Thamnophilidae): The Warbling Antbird (Hypocnemis cantator) complex. The Auk. 124(1): 11–28.
 Zimmer & Isler. 2003. Hypocnemis cantator (Warbling Antbird). Pp. 645 in del Hoyo, Elliott, & Christie. 2003. Handbook of the Birds of the World. Vol. 8. Broadbills to Tapaculos. Lynx Edicions. Barcelona.
 Split Hypocnemis cantator by elevating H. flavescens, peruviana, subflava, ochrogyna and striata to species rank. South American Classification Committee. Accessed 2008-06-27

Hypocnemis
Taxonomy articles created by Polbot
Taxobox binomials not recognized by IUCN